One Chance may refer to:

Music 
 One Chance (group), an American band
 One Chance (album), a 2007 Paul Potts album
 "One Chance", a 2009 Meghan Trainor song from the album Meghan Trainor

Other uses 
 One Chance (film), a 2013 film
 One Chance (video game), a 2010 video game